Pierangelo Metrangolo (born 16 April 1972) is an Italian chemist with interests in supramolecular chemistry and functional materials. He also has an interest in crystal engineering, in particular by using the halogen bond. He is Vice-President and President-Elect of the Physical and Biophysical Chemistry Division (DIV. I) of IUPAC.

Education and professional positions
Metrangolo was born in Lecce, Italy. He obtained his PhD in Industrial Chemistry at the University of Milan in 2001 with a thesis on halogen bonding in supramolecular chemistry. He became assistant professor at the Politecnico di Milano in 2002, where he was promoted to associate professor in 2005 and to full professor of chemistry for technologies in 2011. He is also affiliated to the National Research Council of Italy and holds a visiting professorship at the Aalto University (Finland, since 2015) and at the VTT-Technical Research Centre of Finland (since 2011).

Research interests
His research interests have covered the following topics:
 functional supramolecular materials
 fluorinated nanoparticles and theranostics
 biomimetic and biosynthetic hybrid materials
 intermolecular forces and their use in crystal engineering
 nanomedicine

Honors and awards
 ERC Grantee (2012, European Research Council)
 CrystEngComm Sponsored Lectureship at the 42nd IUPAC World Chemistry Congress (2009)
 Young Observer at the 45th IUPAC General Assembly (2009)
 Journals Grant Award for International Authors (2005, Royal Society of Chemistry)
 G. Ciamician Medal (2005, Italian Chemical Society)
 Titular Member of the IUPAC's Division I Physical and Biophysical Chemistry (2016–2017)
 Co-editor of Acta Crystallographica B (International Union of Crystallography) (2014 onwards)
 Member of the Editorial Board of CrystEngComm (Royal Society of Chemistry) (2013 onwards)
 Member of the Editorial Advisory Board of Crystal Growth & Design (American Chemical Society) (2014 onwards)

References

1972 births
Italian chemists
People from Lecce
Living people
Scientists from Milan
Academic staff of the Polytechnic University of Milan